Shayne Alexander Bower (April 18, 1965 –  June 24, 2007), better known by his ring name Biff Wellington, was a Canadian professional wrestler who was born, raised, and died in Calgary, Alberta.

Professional wrestling career
Shayne Bower trained with the Hart Brothers school by Keith Hart, Mr. Hito and Hiroshi Hase. He made his debut in December 1986 using the name "Biff Wellington" in Stampede Wrestling as a villain, but then transitioned to a fan favourite, which he was for the remainder of his time there. In Stampede, Wellington frequently tagged with Chris Benoit. In 1989, Wellington and Benoit beat Makhan Singh and Vokhan Singh to become Stampede Wrestling's International Tag Team Champions.

After Stampede Wrestling shut down in December 1989, Wellington worked in various promotions in Canada, such as the Canadian National Wrestling Alliance (CNWA) and Canadian Rocky Mountain Wrestling (CRMW).

Wellington then received tryouts for the World Wrestling Federation at the Olympic Saddledome in Calgary, Alberta during a live event on July 8  and the next night, July 9, at the Northlands Coliseum in Edmonton, Alberta, with Wellington beating fellow Canadian Hugh Thomas with a tombstone piledriver (kneeling belly-to-belly piledriver). Despite impressing WWF management, Wellington did not receive a contract with the WWF and returned to the Canadian indies.

In June 1992, Wellington and Benoit appeared in World Championship Wrestling at Clash of the Champions XIX, representing Canada in the NWA World Tag Team Championship tournament; they were defeated by Brian Pillman and Jushin Thunder Liger in the first round.  Later that year, Wellington was recognized as the first CRMW North American Heavyweight Champion.

Between 1988 and 1994, Wellington worked on 28 consecutive tours with New Japan Pro-Wrestling. In Japan, he feuded with Jushin Thunder Liger and continued to team with Benoit, who was known in Japan as the "Pegasus Kid" or "Wild Pegasus". He also worked in the Maritimes as Buddy Hart, and in Mexico.

Wellington had a brief stint in Extreme Championship Wrestling between 1995 and 1996. He sustained an eye injury in an accident during a match against Taz in May 1996. Wellington then became dependent on prescription medication to prevent nerves in his eye from dying. He retired from active competition after the incident, although he occasionally wrestled in promotions near his hometown such as Extreme Canadian Championship Wrestling.

A year later in 1997, Wellington returned to Calgary wrestling for Can-Am Wrestling Federation Wrestling until his last match in 2000.

Death
In later years, Bower suffered from health issues mostly stemming from his back, also suffering strokes and battling drug addiction.

Bower's parents found his body in bed at his home on June 24, 2007; they were concerned because they had not heard from him for four days. Medical officials examining the body believe he had been dead for a few days due to a heart attack. Coincidentally, his body was found on the same day his former tag partner, Chris Benoit, committed suicide, two days after killing his wife and son. The two were friends.

Championships and accomplishments
Canadian Rocky Mountain Wrestling
CRMW North American Heavyweight Championship (1 time)
Can-Am Wrestling Federation
Can-Am Heavyweight Championship (1 Time)
 Pro Wrestling Illustrated
 Ranked No.420 of the top 500 singles wrestlers in the PWI 500 in 2007.
Stampede Wrestling
Stampede International Tag Team Championship (1 time) – with Chris Benoit

See also
 List of premature professional wrestling deaths

References

External links
Biff Wellington at Online World of Wrestling
 

1965 births
2007 deaths
20th-century professional wrestlers
Canadian male professional wrestlers
Professional wrestlers from Calgary
Stampede Wrestling alumni
Stampede Wrestling International Tag Team Champions